Tanda Department is a department of Gontougo Region in Zanzan District, Ivory Coast. In 2021, its population was 113,523 and its seat is the settlement of Tanda. The sub-prefectures of the department are Amanvi, Diamba, Tanda, and Tchèdio.

History

Tanda Department was created in 1988 as a first-level subdivision via a split-off from Bondoukou Department.

In 1997, regions were introduced as new first-level subdivisions of Ivory Coast; as a result, all departments were converted into second-level subdivisions. Tanda Department was included in Zanzan Region.

In 2005, Tanda Department was divided with the split-off creation of Koun-Fao Department. Tanda Department was divided again in 2009 with the creation of Transua Department.

In 2011, districts were introduced as new first-level subdivisions of Ivory Coast. At the same time, regions were reorganised and became second-level subdivisions and all departments were converted into third-level subdivisions. At this time, Tanda Department became part of Gontougo Region in Zanzan District.

Notes

Departments of Gontougo
1988 establishments in Ivory Coast
States and territories established in 1988